

I

J

K

References